Manolo Valdés (born March 8, 1942) is a Spanish artist residing in New York, working in paint, sculpture, and mixed media. He introduced to Spain a form of expression that combined political and social obligations with humor and irony.

Biography 

Manolo Valdés was born in Valencia on March 8, 1942. He entered the Escuela de Bellas Artes de San Carlos in 1957, where he studied two years. In 1964 he established the artists' group Equipo Crónica with Joan Toledo and Rafael Solbes in which he remained until Solbes' death in 1981. He now lives and works in New York City with a further residence in The Hamptons and Miami.

Work 

Influenced by Velázquez, Rembrandt, Rubens, Matisse, Picasso, and others Valdés creates large works in which the lighting and colors express a sensation of tactility. His work is forceful and decorated with historical art symbols. Valdés creates paintings, monumental sculptures, etchings, and collages.

Along with the works he exhibited as a part of Equipo Crónicas, Valdés had over seventy expositions between 1965 and 1981, as many individual as collective. His work has been displayed at prestigious art galleries and museums, notably; Guggenheim in New York, Opera Gallery New York, the Hirschhorn in Washington, DC, and multiple art capitals of the world such as London, Berlin, Paris, Milan, Rome, Seoul, Istanbul, The Hague, and Monaco etc.

Valdés has received various awards, including the Lissone and Biella in Milan in 1965; the silver medal in the second International Prints Biennial in Tokyo; an award from the Bridgestone Art Museum in Lisbon; the Alfons Roig Award in Valencia; the National Award for Plastic Arts in Spain; a medal from the biennial International Festival of the Plastic Arts in Baghdad; and in 1993 the Medal of the Order of Andrés Bello in Venezuela.

The sociologist Zygmunt Bauman has qualified him as one of the most outstanding exponents of liquid art, in his work Liquid Life, together with Herman Braun-Vega and Jacques Villeglé.

Gallery

References

External links 
 Galeria Freites
 Marlborough Gallery information
 A Spanish biography
 Manolo Valdés: Biography and critical analysis
 Equipo Crónica

 Trained as a painter, Valdés grew up imbibing the works of Spanish masters like Diego Velázquez and Pablo Picasso, later becoming influenced by Pop Art.

20th-century Spanish painters
20th-century Spanish male artists
Spanish male painters
21st-century Spanish painters
Spanish sculptors
Spanish male sculptors
1942 births
Living people
20th-century sculptors
Spanish contemporary artists
21st-century Spanish male artists